Paul Ciulini (born October 28, 1995) is a Canadian rugby union player who plays for the Toronto Arrows of Major League Rugby (MLR). The position he plays is lock.

Rugby career
Ciulini first started playing rugby with the Aurora Barbarians in 2007 with their under-12 team. Ciulini first earned national team honours with the Canada U20 team in 2015. 

Ciulini played for the Toronto Arrows in 2018 during their exhibition season. On November 6, 2018 Ciulini signed with the Arrows ahead of their 2019 debut season in Major League Rugby. His first match with the Arrows was on January 26, 2019 against the NOLA Gold.

Club statistics

References 

1995 births
Living people
Toronto Arrows players
Canadian rugby union players
Canada international rugby union players
Rugby union locks